The Northrop Grumman AN/ZPY-1 STARLite Small Tactical Radar - Lightweight is a small, lightweight synthetic aperture radar/GMTI radar used in tactical operations. The radar is under contract to the U.S. Army Communications and Electronics Command for its ERMP General Atomics MQ-1C Gray Eagle Unmanned Aerial System and is manufactured by Northrop Grumman.  STARLite weighs ., occupies , and requires less than 750W of power. The Army began to take delivery of the system in 2010. Also in 2010 the system was ready for deployment to the battlefield.

From the first orders in 2008 to October 2012, Northrop Grumman delivered half of the 174 radars ordered. Eighteen of the radars on order are a lighter, extended-range version. Weight was reduced by combining the radar power supply and processor and incorporating a Systron Donner inertial system. The new system weights . The original STARLite radar is used on the MQ-1C Gray Eagle and the Lockheed Martin Persistent Threat Detection System (PTDS) aerostat. The company is proposing the lighter version for integration onto small UAVs, including the RQ-7B Shadow, the MQ-8C Fire Scout, and the TigerShark UAS. Other potential customers include the Department of Homeland Security, which flies the MQ-1 Predator and MQ-9 Guardian, and NATO countries. The active electronically scanned radar is mounted on a rotating mechanical gimbal with a 360 degree field of regard, although the antenna itself has a 110 degree field of view.

References

External links
 AN/ZPY-1 STARLite Small Tactical Radar - Lightweight (Northrop Grumman)
 U.S. Army Communications and Electronics Command 
 Northrop Grumman Expanding STARLite Radar Capabilities 
 Army chooses lightweight surveillance radar system from Northrop Grumman for Sky Warrior UAV (Military & Aerospace Electronics)

Aircraft radars
Military electronics of the United States
Northrop Grumman radars
Synthetic aperture radar